Erika Vouk (born 1941) is a Slovene poet and translator.

She won both the Jenko Award in 2002 and the Veronika Award in 2004 for her poetry collection Opis slike.

Poetry collections

 Bela Evridika (1984)
 Anima (1990)
 Belo drevo (2000)
 Opis slike (2002)
 Album (2003)
 Valovanje (2003)
 Z zamahom ptice neka roka slika (2007)
 Rubin (2008)

References

Slovenian poets
Slovenian translators
Slovenian women poets
Living people
1941 births
People from Nova Gorica
Veronika Award laureates